Aamir Aziz (born 12 August 1990) is an Indian first-class cricketer who plays for Jammu & Kashmir. He made his List A debut for Jammu & Kashmir in the 2016–17 Vijay Hazare Trophy on 25 February 2017. He made his Twenty20 debut on 18 January 2021, for Jammu & Kashmir in the 2020–21 Syed Mushtaq Ali Trophy.

References

External links
 

1990 births
Living people
Indian cricketers
Jammu and Kashmir cricketers
People from Jammu